Leslie John Binkley (born June 6, 1934) is a Canadian former professional ice hockey player. Binkley played goaltender in the National Hockey League (NHL) for the Pittsburgh Penguins and in the World Hockey Association (WHA) for the Ottawa Nationals and Toronto Toros. He later served as a scout for both the Pittsburgh Penguins and Winnipeg Jets.

Career
Les Binkley spent his early career in the minor leagues and did not play in the NHL until his thirties. After spending the 1960–61 season as the trainer and emergency goalie for the Cleveland Barons of the American Hockey League (AHL), he won the Dudley "Red" Garrett Memorial Award as the AHL's top rookie in 1962, and was awarded the Harry "Hap" Holmes Memorial Award four years later for allowing the fewest goals in the league. Binkley was the starting goaltender for the Pittsburgh Penguins in the team's inaugural season in the NHL.  During the 1970 Stanley Cup playoffs, Binkley won six games--the first postseason victories for the Penguin franchise.  After five seasons with the Penguins, he played in the WHA with the Ottawa Nationals and Toronto Toros.  Binkley played in 196 NHL regular season games and retired with a career GAA of 3.12.

He won two Stanley Cup championships in 1991 and 1992 as a scout for the Pittsburgh Penguins.

Achievements and awards
EHL Second All-Star Team (1957)
Dudley "Red" Garrett Memorial Award (Rookie of the Year - AHL) (1962)
AHL Second All-Star Team (1964, 1966)
Harry "Hap" Holmes Memorial Award (fewest goals against - AHL) (1966)
WHL Second All-Star Team (1967)
Two Stanley Cup championships as a scout for the Pittsburgh Penguins (1991 and 1992)
First NHL goaltender to wear contact lenses (1967)
First player signed by the Pittsburgh Penguins club in its first NHL season

Personal life
Binkley currently resides in Walkerton, Ontario. His wife Eleanor passed away in September 2021.  He has two children, Randall and Leslie, and five grandchildren, Jana, Jonathan, Curtis, Kara and Jordan. Curtis Binkley is also a goaltender, and was drafted by the Guelph Storm of the Ontario Hockey League in 2002.

Career statistics

References

External links
 

1934 births
Baltimore Clippers (1954–56) players
Buffalo Norsemen players
Canadian ice hockey goaltenders
Charlotte Clippers players
Ice hockey people from Ontario
Living people
New York Rangers scouts
Ottawa Nationals players
Sportspeople from Owen Sound
Pittsburgh Penguins players
Pittsburgh Penguins scouts
San Diego Gulls (WHL) players
Stanley Cup champions
Toronto Toros players
Winnipeg Jets (1972–1996) coaches
Winnipeg Jets (1972–1996) scouts
Canadian ice hockey coaches